The 46th Annual TV Week Logie Awards was held on Sunday 18 April 2004 at the Crown Palladium in Melbourne, and broadcast on the Nine Network. The ceremony was hosted by Eddie McGuire, and guests included Mel Brooks and Ronn Moss.

Winners and nominees
In the tables below, winners are listed first and highlighted in bold.

Gold Logie

Acting/Presenting

Most Popular Programs

Most Outstanding Programs

Performers
Anastacia
Michael Bublé – "Moondance"
Shannon Noll
Guy Sebastian
Jane Turner (Kath) and Gina Riley (Kim) – "Lady Bump"
Cirque du Soleil

Hall of Fame
After a lifetime in the television industry, Sam Chisholm became the 21st inductee into the TV Week Logies Hall of Fame.

References

External links
 

2004 television awards
2004
2004 in Australian television
2004 awards in Australia